Joseph York Hodsdon (October 20, 1836 – February 24, 1901) was an American businessman and politician from Maine. A resident of Yarmouth, he was a Republican state senator from 1899 to 1901 and a shoe manufacturer.

Early life
Hodsdon was born on October 20, 1836, in Portland, Maine, to Andrew Hodsdon and Rachel May York.

Career
Between 1869 and 1880, Hodsdon operated Caldwell & Hodsdon, a shoe factory in Portland. In 1880, he relocated to Yarmouth, taking over the former Farris tannery, where he established Hodsdon Brothers & Company by the town's Fourth Falls, at the western end of today's Royal River Park.  In 1888, he built a large, modern factory building in the town. Hodsdon renamed his business as the Hodsdon Shoe Company in 1896.

He was also a director of the Yarmouth Manufacturing Company.

In 1899, he was elected to the Maine Senate for Cumberland County. He was re-elected shortly before his death.

Personal life

Hodsdon was married to Georgia Anna Small, with whom he had one son, Grenville Andrew, in 1864. He was named for his Georgia's brother, who died five years earlier.

Hodsdon was a member of Yarmouth's First Universalist Church on the town's Main Street, and was also a freemason.

Death
Hodsdon died on February 24, 1901, aged 64, while in Augusta, Maine, attending the Maine Legislature. He had been ill with appendicitis for around ten days, although his condition had been improving immediately prior to his death. His body was brought south to Yarmouth in a special train carriage arranged by Maine Central Railroad.

His funeral was held on February 27 – a service at his family home, followed by burial in Yarmouth's Riverside Cemetery.

His business closed upon his death.

References

1836 births
1901 deaths
People from Portland, Maine
People from Yarmouth, Maine
19th-century American businesspeople
20th-century American businesspeople
Republican Party Maine state senators
American Freemasons
Deaths from appendicitis